Les Rendez-vous d'Anna (known in English as The Meetings of Anna and Meetings with Anna) is a 1978 drama film written and directed by Chantal Akerman.

Plot
Anne Silver, a Belgian filmmaker, is travelling through West Germany, Belgium, and France to promote her new film. Along the way, she meets with strangers, friends, former lovers, and family members, all the while traversing an isolating and increasingly homogeneous Western Europe. Among the people she meets is her own mother, to whom she talks about falling in love with a woman who she only talks to over the phone now. At the end, she is back in her apartment, listening to messages on her answering machine, alone as ever. The calls are from various friends and/or lovers, who express frustration at her unavailability, and also a manager who wants to make sure she shows up for all of her promotional appearances. The last message is from her female lover, who is wondering where she is. Anne does not call anyone back.

Cast
 Aurore Clément as Anne Silver
 Jean-Pierre Cassel as Daniel
 Magali Noël as Ida
 Helmut Griem as Heinrich
 Hanns Zischler as Hans
 Lea Massari as Anne's mother

Critical reception
The movie initially was not well received, though it has since risen in prestige. Many critics found fault with what they perceived as a "scaling-back of the stylistic and thematic radicalism" to be found in Akerman's Jeanne Dielman, 23 quai du Commerce, 1080 Bruxelles (1975). On the review aggregator website Rotten Tomatoes, the film holds an approval rating of 67% based on reviews from 6 critics, with an average rating of 8/10. It received the André Cavens Award for Best Film given by the Belgian Film Critics Association (UCC).

References

External links
 
 
 

1978 LGBT-related films
1970s drama road movies
1970s feminist films
1970s French films
1970s French-language films
1970s German films
Belgian drama films
Belgian LGBT-related films
Films about film directors and producers
Films directed by Chantal Akerman
Films set in Brussels
Films set in Cologne
Films set in Paris
Films set on trains
French drama road movies
French feminist films
French LGBT-related films
French-language Belgian films
German drama road movies
Lesbian-related films
LGBT-related drama films
West German films